David Thomas Hugh Buchanan (born 6 May 1986) is a footballer who played in the Football League for Bury, Tranmere Rovers, Preston North End and Northampton Town, and in the Scottish Premier League for Hamilton Academical. Though born in England, Buchanan represented Northern Ireland at under-19 and under-21 level. A left-back, Buchanan played most recently for Chesterfield. His cousin is former Lisburn Distillery footballer Wayne Buchanan.

Career
Born in Rochdale, Greater Manchester, Buchanan was called into the Northern Ireland under-19 squad in November 2004 for their match against Italy.

Buchanan was released from Bury at the end of his contract. The club had offered Buchanan a new contract, however after previous failed negotiations and period of no response from the player following a new contract offer, the club sought a replacement player and issued a statement claiming that the club would not be held to ransom over contract negotiations.

Hamilton Academical
He signed for Hamilton Academical in July 2010

Tranmere Rovers
He moved to Tranmere Rovers in the summer of 2011. The club offered him contract terms for the 2012–13 season. Although the club reported that he and his agent had agreed a two-year contract, they reported on 24 May that Preston North End had agreed a deal with them.

Preston North End
Buchanan made his debut for Preston on 13 August 2012 against Huddersfield Town in the first round of the League Cup. On 17 December 2013, Buchanan extended his contract with Preston for a further twelve months, thus keeping him at the club until the summer of 2015.

Northampton Town
Buchanan signed with League Two club Northampton Town following his release by Preston North End.
He was one of 8 players released by Northampton at the end of the 2018–19 season; a further 3 were placed for sale.

Chesterfield
In June 2019 Buchanan signed a two-year contract to play for Chesterfield in the National League for the 2019/2020 season. At the end of the 2020–21 season, Buchanan was released.

Rochdale Sacred Heart FC 
In 2021, Buchanan signed for Manchester Football League Premier Division side Rochdale Sacred Heart following his release from Chesterfield.

Career statistics

Honours
Individual
Tranmere Rovers Player of the Year: 2011–12

References

External links

1986 births
Living people
Footballers from Rochdale
English footballers
Northern Ireland under-21 international footballers
Association football defenders
Bolton Wanderers F.C. players
Bury F.C. players
Hamilton Academical F.C. players
Tranmere Rovers F.C. players
Preston North End F.C. players
Northampton Town F.C. players
Chesterfield F.C. players
English Football League players
Scottish Premier League players